Lam Ka Seng (born 28 May 1994) is a Macanese international footballer who plays as a midfielder for Chao Pak Kei and the Macau national football team.

International career
Lam made his senior international debut in 2014, replacing Chi Hang Pang in a 0-0 draw with Guam. He scored in a 5-1 friendly defeat by Taiwan in late 2015.

Career statistics

Club

Notes

International

International goals
Scores and results list Macau's goal tally first.

References

External links
 

1994 births
Living people
Macau footballers
Macau international footballers
Association football midfielders
Liga de Elite players
Chao Pak Kei players